Shellsville is an unincorporated community in East Hanover Township, Dauphin County, Pennsylvania, United States. It is part of the Harrisburg–Carlisle Metropolitan Statistical Area.

References
Map Of Shellsville by MapQuest

See also
Hollywood Casino at Penn National Race Course

Harrisburg–Carlisle metropolitan statistical area
Unincorporated communities in Dauphin County, Pennsylvania
Unincorporated communities in Pennsylvania